Devon Frank Williams (born 16 April 1992 in Stellenbosch) is a South African rugby union player for the  in the Currie Cup and in the Rugby Challenge. His regular position is winger or fullback.

Career

Youth

Williams represented  since Under-18 level, playing for them at the Academy Week and Craven Week tournaments in 2010. In 2011, he played for the  side in the 2011 Under-19 Provincial Championship competition, scoring three tries in thirteen appearances. He played for the  side in 2012 (finishing joint-fifth top try scorer with six tries in just seven starts, despite missing a large part of the season through injury) and 2013, scoring eight tries in fourteen starts and winning the "U21 Back of the Year" award.

Senior career

His first taste of senior rugby came in 2013, when he was included in the  squad for the 2013 Vodacom Cup competition.

His 2014 Vodacom Cup campaign saw him score an incredible nine tries in the first six matches of the competition.

He twice came on as a blood-bin substitute to make his Super Rugby debut.

Sevens

He joined the South Africa Sevens Academy in 2014.

References

South African rugby union players
Living people
1992 births
People from Stellenbosch
Stormers players
Western Province (rugby union) players
Rugby union wings
Pumas (Currie Cup) players
Rugby union players from the Western Cape